St. Arockiya Nathar Church, Vavathurai is a Catholic church located in Vavathurai, Kanyakumari, India.

Photo Gallery : Kanyakumari and Around

Kanyakumari
Roman Catholic churches in Tamil Nadu

ta:வார்ப்புரு:கன்னியாகுமரி மாவட்டம்